I'm No Angel is the fourth studio album by the Gregg Allman Band, released on Epic Records in 1987.  The album is particularly notable for the strength of its title song, which was later covered by others, including Cher, Gregg Allman's former wife.

History 
Three singles were released from the album, in 1987.  The title track, "I'm No Angel" peaked at Number 49 on the Billboard Hot 100, but reached Number 1 on Billboard's Mainstream Rock Tracks. "Anything Goes" reached Number 3 on Mainstream Rock Tracks, while "Can't Keep Running" reached Number 25 on the same list.  Released in 1987, the album peaked at Number 30 on the Billboard 200.

Track listing 
"I'm No Angel"  (Tony Colton, Phil Palmer) – 3:42  
"Anything Goes"  (Gregg Allman) – 4:12  
"Evidence of Love" (Chris Farren, Steve Diamond) – 4:34 
"Yours for the Asking"  (Allman, Dan Toler, Frankie Toler) – 3:16  
"Things That Might Have Been" (Allman, D. Toler) – 4:26  
"Can't Keep Running"  (Michael Bolton, Martin Briley) – 4:02 
"Faces Without Names"  (Allman, D. Toler) – 3:36  
"Lead Me On"  (Allman, D. Toler) – 4:44
"Don't Want You No More"  (Spencer Davis, Eddie Hardin) – 2:31  
"It's Not My Cross to Bear"  (Allman) – 5:37

Personnel 
The Gregg Allman Band
Gregg Allman – Hammond Organ,  Lead Vocals
Dan Toler – Guitar  
Bruce Waibel – Bass Guitar, Background Vocals
Tim Heding – Keyboards, Background Vocals
David Frankie Toler – Drums
Chaz Trippy – Percussion

Additional musicians
Ed Callie – Tenor Sax
Eric White – Horn Arrangements 
Don Johnson – Vocals on track 3 (Evidence of Love)

Production
Rodney Mills – Producer, Engineer
Leslie (Lee) Shapiro - Assistant Engineer
Bud Snyder – Production Coordination
Bob Ludwig – Mastering
Brian Hagiwara – Photography
Holland MacDonald – Art Direction
Linda Evans Phillips – Artwork

Crew
John Emery – Stage Manager  
Mike Logan – Stage Technician

Certifications

References 

1987 albums
Gregg Allman albums
Albums produced by Rodney Mills
Epic Records albums